National Sports Academy was a private preparatory school for winter-sport athletes in Lake Placid, New York, United States. The academy was closed in 2015.

History
The school began in 1977 as Mountain House, a winter tutorial program for student-athletes. The school changed from a winter-only program to a traditional school calendar in 1981, and changed its name to National Sports Academy on March 17, 1989.

Campus and Nearby Training Facilities Used by NSA Student Athletes  

The school covers grades 9-12 and is located in the former Winterset Inn, which housed Italian athletes during the 1980 Winter Olympics. The schools main building which houses cafeteria, dorm rooms and classrooms is located directly across from Mirror Lake. The average number of boarding students is around 200 Students per year.  The school is located steps from the Olympic Center which is a massive sports facility which houses 3 Hockey rinks and was home to the 1932 and 1980 Olympic Hockey competitions where the United States famously won the Gold medal (1980). The Olympic Center is the home practice and game facility for all of the National Sports Academy hockey players and speed skating athletes. The varsity A boys and girls teams practice daily and host all home games on the Herb Brooks Arena which is a 13,450 seat arena with a full Olympic sized sheet of ice.   Players use the weight rooms, basketball courts and other amenities in the Olympic Center to help train them off ice. Outside is the Olympic Speed skating oval which has hosted many international competitions, most notably  the 1932 and 1980 Olympic games. Alpine skiers are fortunate enough to have one of the best locations in the US for the advancement of their skills. Skiers train at the Olympic Training Center which hosts winter sport athletes from the US and other countries who are living in Lake Placid or in town to train for extended periods of time. This gives NSA student athletes a first hand opportunity to train with and observe the training practices of some of the top athletes in their respective sports. The Olympic Sports Complex is the third significant facility that NSA athletes have full access and use of on a daily basis. The current home of the US Olympic Men's and Women's sliding teams. (Luge, Bobsled and Skeleton) The sliding track was the home of the 32 and 80 Olympic games and has been one of the premier tracks in North America in the past 15 years in terms of training and competition sliding events. Students go to class in the afternoon and end in the late evening.

Curriculum
The school's student athletes focus on one of ten winter sports: Alpine skiing, freestyle skiing, snowboarding, Nordic skiing, ski jumping, Nordic combined, biathlon, figure skating, luge, and boys’ and girls’ hockey. Academic studies are addressed by a rigorous college-preparatory curriculum and specialized curricula and tutors for students who travel to compete.

Extracurricular activities
Student groups and activities at National Sports Academy include a community service committee, a cultural arts committee, Coffee Haus, dodgeball club, ping pong tournaments, student council, a sustainability and stewardship council, ultimate Frisbee club, and yearbook.

Notable alumni
National Sports Academy has had 34 National team members, 21 members of the U.S. Ski Team, five Members US Jr. Luge Team, 2 members of the Czech Women's Ice Hockey Team, and its alumni have won five National Nordic Skiing Titles, 5 Nordic Skiing Medalists, eight Jr. National Skiing Titles, and one Women's National Luge Champion. 
 A. J. Kitt, Alpine Skiing
 Duncan Kennedy, Luge
 Cammy Myler, Luge
 Samantha Retrosi, Luge
 Courtney Zablocki, Luge
 Billy Demog, Nordic Combined (Gold and Silver Medalist)
 Tucker West, Luge
 Lindsay Van, Ski Jumper
 Carrie Johnson 
 Haley Johnson, Biathlon
 Summer Britchner, Luge
 John Farra, Biathlon
 Ray DiLauro, Ice Hockey
 Reese Wisnowski, Ice Hockey
 Aidan Kelly, Luge
 Chris Mazdzer, Luge
 Nicole Giannino, Ice Hockey (Boston Blades, CWHL) Team USA World Inline Hockey Team
 Kali Flanagan, Women’s Olympic Gold Medalist

References

Educational institutions established in 1977
Educational institutions disestablished in 2015
Sports schools in the United States
Private high schools in New York (state)
1977 establishments in New York (state)